Tarauacá Kashinawa (Cashinahua of the Tarauacá River) is an extinct indigenous once spoken in the western Brazilian Amazon Basin.

References

Indigenous languages of Western Amazonia
Panoan languages
Extinct languages of South America